The Minister of Transport is a Minister of the Cabinet of South Africa who is responsible for overseeing the Department of Transport.

List of Past Ministers

Minister of Transport, 1989–2019

References

External links
Ministry of Transport
Department of Transport

Transport
 
South Africa
Lists of political office-holders in South Africa